Athletic Club is a Brazilian association football club from São João del-Rei, state of Minas Gerais, founded in 1909.

Name 
The team's name is often shortened to Athletic or A.C. simply.

Pronunciation 
Brazilians pronounce it stressing the last syllable: Athletic.

Relevance 
It is the only club in the Intermediate Geographic Region of Barbacena competing in the First Division of the Campeonato Mineiro.

History
The club was founded on June 27, 1909. Its foundation had no relation with the team from Belo Horizonte which has a similar name and colour, Atlético Mineiro.

Return to professional football (2018-present)

2018

Campeonato Mineiro - Segunda Divisão 
After 50 years out of professional football, the club returned in 2018. It disputed the Campeonato Mineiro Segunda Divisão, equivalent of the third division of the Campeonato Mineiro.

The team qualified third in the first round. In the semifinals, it eliminated Valeriodoce, and gained access to the 2019 Campeonato Mineiro Módulo II. Athletic ended in second place, after losing the final on penalties to Coimbra Sports.

2019

Campeonato Mineiro - Módulo II 
In 2019, Athletic participated in Campeonato Mineiro Módulo II, finishing in seventh place and remaining in the competition.

2020

Campeonato Mineiro - Módulo II 
In 2020, the team finished the qualifying round of Campeonato Mineiro Módulo II in second place, qualifying for the final quadrangular. In the final stage, it finished again in the vice-leadership, winning the vice-championship of Module II and being promoted to Module I 2021.

2021

Campeonato Mineiro 
The team disputed the 2021 Campeonato Mineiro. It was the first time that the club disputed the first division of the Campeonato Mineiro and attracted the attention of the media when hired the Uruguayan player Loco Abreu.

It was defeated by URT in Patos de Minas at the semifinals of Troféu Inconfidência.

2022

Campeonato Mineiro 
In 2022 Campeonato Mineiro, the team was the best in the state outside the capital, Belo Horizonte, therefore winning the title Campeão Mineiro do Interior for the first time.

2023

Recopa Mineira 
The team won the Recopa Mineira in January by defeating Esporte Clube Democrata.

Campeonato Mineiro 
In 2023 Campeonato Mineiro, the team again was the best in the state outside the capital, Belo Horizonte, therefore winning the title Campeão Mineiro do Interior a second time.

At the semifinal, it was eliminated by Atlético.

Copa do Brasil 
The team was defeated by Brasiliense at 2023 Copa do Brasil and kicked from the tournament.

Campeonato Brasileiro - Série D 
The team will compete at the 2023 Campeonato Brasileiro Série D.

2024

Recopa Mineira 
The team will dispute the 2024 Recopa Mineira.

Campeonato Mineiro 
The team will dispute the 2024 Campeonato Mineiro - Módulo I.

Copa do Brasil 
The team will dispute the 2024 Copa do Brasil.

Campeonato Brasileiro 
The team will dispute the 2024 Campeonato Brasileiro - Série D if it does not classify to 2024 Campeonato Brasileiro - Série C.

Stadium

The club's football matches take place at Joaquim Portugal Stadium.

In January 2021, the board made the club's stadium available to the city for use as a vaccination point.

Public relations

Death of Pelé 
The team published an official lamentation for the death of the King of Football, Pelé, in December.

Charity

Blood donation 
The team stimulates the blood donation to the state of Minas Gerais' public foundation for hematology and blood transfusion, Hemominas (Fundação Centro de Hematologia e Hemoterapia do Estado de Minas Gerais).

Winter clothes 
The team stimulates the donation of winter clothes in the city.

References 

Football clubs in Minas Gerais
Association football clubs established in 1909
Football clubs in Brazil
1909 establishments in Brazil
Campeonato Mineiro
Copa do Brasil
Campeonato Brasileiro Série D